The House on the Strand is a novel by Daphne du Maurier, first published in the UK in 1969 by Victor Gollancz, with a jacket illustration by her daughter, Flavia Tower. The US edition was published by Doubleday.

Like many of du Maurier's novels, The House on the Strand has a supernatural element, exploring the ability to mentally travel back in time and experience historical events at first hand - but not to influence them. It has been called a Gothic tale, "influenced by writers as diverse as Robert Louis Stevenson, Dante, and the psychologist Carl Jung, in which a sinister potion enables the central character to escape the constraints of his dreary married life by travelling back through time". The narrator agrees to test a drug that transports him back to 14th century Cornwall and becomes absorbed in the lives of people he meets there, to the extent that the two worlds he is living in start to merge.

It is set in and around Kilmarth, where Daphne du Maurier lived from 1967, near the village of Tywardreath, which in Cornish means "House on the Strand".

Plot
The setting for the story is an ancient Cornish house called Kilmarth, which is based on the house the author had recently bought following the death of her husband. 

After giving up his job the narrator, Dick Young, is offered the use of Kilmarth by an old university friend, biophysicist Magnus Lane. Dick reluctantly agrees to act as a test subject for a drug that Magnus has secretly developed. On taking it for the first time, he finds that it enables him to enter into the landscape around him as it existed during the early 14th century. He becomes drawn into the lives of the people he sees there and is soon addicted to the experience. Dick finds himself following Roger, who lives at Kilmarth, acts as steward to Sir Henry Champernoune, and is a secret admirer of the beautiful Isolda, wife of Sir Oliver Carminowe. She has been conducting a secret affair with the brother of Sir Henry's wife, Sir Otto Bodrugan, who is waylaid and killed by Oliver's men.

Each visit corresponds to a key moment in the story of Isolda and Roger. Each time Dick returns to real time he is more confused; throughout the experience he is unable to interact with the couple. Any attempt to do so brings Dick crashing back to the present in a state of nauseated exhaustion. The drug has other dangers in that following Roger means that Dick walks unaware through the modern landscape with all the danger that entails.

Dick's American wife Vita and his young stepsons join him at Kilmarth and are worried by his bizarre behaviour. It is made clear that Dick has no passionate feelings for his wife, does not want the new job in the US she has found for him and has no fatherly affection for her two boys—which makes plausible his increasing desire to escape into the past. Magnus intends to join Dick but is killed in what seems like a bizarre accident or suicide—struck by a train whilst straying onto the local railway track. Dick knows that Magnus was under the influence of the drug; this makes the inquest difficult.

Dick's penultimate trip ends with him attempting to defend Isolda from Sir Henry's vindictive widow Joanna in the 14th century, but in reality attacking Vita. She and her children hide from him and he contacts a doctor who helps to wean him from his addiction to the drug. Dick explains the power of the drug, and is informed by the doctor that analysis has revealed its extremely dangerous nature. However, Dick's addiction is such that he takes the last remaining dose soon after.

Dick's last visit occurs during the Black Death in 1349. A dying Roger confesses his love for Isolda and the fact that she died peacefully from a drug he administered rather than from the plague. After the death of his doppelgänger Roger and the Isolda they both loved, Dick has little incentive to return to the other world, but in any case there is no drug left to allow his passage there. As the book closes, Dick attempts to pick up the phone but suddenly finds he is unable to grip it. Speaking of the novel's unresolved ending, Daphne du Maurier said in an interview: "What about the hero of The House on the Strand? What did it mean when he dropped the telephone at the end of the book? I don’t really know, but I rather think he was going to be paralysed for life. Don’t you?"

Radio versions
 1973 BBC Radio Saturday Night Theatre - Adapted by Philip Leaver and Kay Patrick, starring Ian Richardson. BBC Genome
 2008 BBC Radio 7, twelve part reading by Julian Wadham  BBC Genome

References

External links
The House on the Strand

1969 British novels
1969 science fiction novels
Novels by Daphne du Maurier
Novels about time travel
History of Cornwall
British historical novels
Novels set in Cornwall
Novels set in the 14th century
Victor Gollancz Ltd books
English Gothic novels